UGM is an abbreviation that has several meanings:

 Union General Meeting, a variety of legislative body controlling the affairs of a students' union
 Universitas Gadjah Mada, university in Indonesia
 UG Madness, a webcomic about the cardgame Magic: the Gathering.
 Universal Graphics Module, a standard for connecting graphics card modules to embedded/industrial computer systems.
 Union Gospel Mission, a Christian-based homeless shelter located in cities across the country
 The US Military designation for an underwater-launched, surface attack guided missile. Examples include the UGM-133 Trident II nuclear ballistic missile and the UGM-84 Harpoon anti-ship missile.
 Abbreviation for You Got Mail (U Got Mail)
 Unknown Gun Men: this came from series of killing in the South East region of Nigeria around the year 2021 
 The Ultimate Games Master UGM role-play companion app.
 UGM I and II: Viktor Rydberg's Undersökningar i Germanisk Mytologie, in two volumes, 1886-1889.